Portugal was represented by Armando Gama, with the song "Esta balada que te dou", at the 1983 Eurovision Song Contest, which took place in Munich on 23 April. Gama was the winner of the Portuguese national final for the contest, held on 5 March. The song was chosen through a national final organised by broadcaster RTP.

Before Eurovision

Festival da Canção 1983 
The national final was held at the Coliseu in Porto in Porto, hosted by Valentina Torres and Eládio Clímaco. The winning song was chosen by the votes of 22 regional juries.

Armando Gama previously took part in the 1980 Portuguese semi-finals with the group Sarabanda. Carlos Paião represented Portugal in ESC 1981.

At Eurovision 
On the night of the final Gama performed 17th in the running order, following Israel and preceding Austria. At the close of voting "Esta balada que te dou" placing Portugal 13th of the 20 entries. The Portuguese jury awarded its 12 points to the winner song from Luxembourg.

Voting

References 

1983
Countries in the Eurovision Song Contest 1983
Eurovision